Goul is a river in the Massif Central of France. It runs through the Cantal (Vezels-Roussy, Leucamp, Ladinhac, Lapeyrugue, Cros-de-Ronesque, Jou-sous-Monjou, Saint-Clément, Pailherols, Taussac, Raulhac) and the Aveyron (Saint-Hippolyte, Murols) for 52 kilometers. It is a tributary of the river Truyère.

References

Rivers of Auvergne-Rhône-Alpes
Rivers of Occitania (administrative region)
Massif Central
Rivers of France
Rivers of Cantal
Rivers of Aveyron